Scrobipalpa adaptata is a moth of the family Gelechiidae. It is found in southern Ukraine and Russia (the southern Ural).

References

Moths described in 2001
Scrobipalpa